Wedderburn may refer to:

People 
 Alexander Wedderburn (disambiguation)
 Bill Wedderburn, Baron Wedderburn of Charlton (1927–2012), British politician and legal scholar
 Charles F. Wedderburn (1892–1917), United States Navy officer
 David Wedderburn (disambiguation)
 Dorothy Wedderburn (1925–2012), British academic
 Ernest Wedderburn (1884–1958), Scottish lawyer
 James Wedderburn (disambiguation)
 Joseph Wedderburn (1882–1948), Scottish mathematician
 John Wedderburn of Ballindean (1729–1803), Scottish landowner
 Nat Wedderburn (born 1991), English footballer
 Richard Wedderburn (d. 1601), Scottish merchant based in Denmark
 Robert Wedderburn (disambiguation)
 Tim Wedderburn, Canadian hockey player
 William Wedderburn (1838–1918), Scottish civil servant and politician
 Zander Wedderburn (1935–2017), British psychologist

Places 
 Wedderburn, Victoria, Australia
 Wedderburn, New South Wales, Australia
 Wedderburn, New Zealand
 Wedderburn, Oregon, United States
 Wedderburn Castle, in Scotland

Other uses

See also 
 Clan Wedderburn
 "Captain Wedderburn's Courtship", a Scottish ballad
 Wedderburn baronets